Ben Matthew Wheeler (born 10 November 1991) is a New Zealand international cricketer who plays limited over cricket for New Zealand. He made his One Day International debut against England on 14 June 2015.

Domestic career
Wheeler plays for the Central Districts Stags in the Plunket Shield and Marlborough in the Hawke Cup. He is the grandson of Ray Dowker who played for the Canterbury Wizards in the Plunket Shield, and the younger brother of Otago Highlanders lock, Joe Wheeler.

In June 2018, he was awarded a contract with Central Districts for the 2018–19 season. He was the leading wicket-taker for Central Districts in the 2018–19 Ford Trophy, with ten dismissals in four matches.

International career
Wheeler was part of the New Zealand squad for the 2010 Under 19 Cricket World Cup.

Wheeler was called up to New Zealand ODI squad in 2015 after the World Cup. Wheeler made his debut in the third ODI against England picking up 3/63 in his 10 overs. On 3 January 2017 he made his T20I debut for New Zealand against Bangladesh.

References

1991 births
Living people
New Zealand cricketers
New Zealand One Day International cricketers
New Zealand Twenty20 International cricketers
Central Districts cricketers
South Island cricketers